Theodore Thomas Bugas (June 5, 1924 – August 20, 2022) was an American politician.

Biography

He was a member of the Oregon House of Representatives. He was also a business executive and vice president of a fishery product company.

Bugas died from COVID-19 in Portland on August 20, 2022, at the age of 98.

References

1924 births
2022 deaths
Deaths from the COVID-19 pandemic in Oregon
Republican Party members of the Oregon House of Representatives
Politicians from Astoria, Oregon
Businesspeople from Oregon
People from Sweetwater County, Wyoming